Maharaja Yadavindra Singh International Cricket Stadium is a cricket stadium in Mullanpur, Mohali, Punjab. In March 2010, the Punjab Cricket Association announced that Mullanpur village of  Mohali is going to have an international standard cricket stadium spread over 41.95 acre at cost of Rs 230 crore (29 million USD).

Due to proximity of Mullanpur to Mohali and Chandigarh, it is for people to reach there easy and the crowd management will be simpler. PCA has also planned to provide better parking lots, state-of-the-art gymnasium and a club house at the new stadium with two grounds for matches and practice as well as state of the art cricket academy of stature which would attract trainees.

See also 

 Inderjit Singh Bindra Stadium

References 

Sport in Mohali
Cricket grounds in Punjab, India
Sports venues in Chandigarh
Proposed sports venues in India
Proposed stadiums
Buildings and structures in Mohali
Cricket in Chandigarh